Mark Pharaoh (18 July 1931 – 27 April 2020) was a track and field athlete, who competed in the discus throw at both the 1952 Helsinki Olympics and the 1956 Melbourne Olympics where he came fourth. This has been described as by far the finest single achievement in British discus history. He was also an international shot put and hammer thrower. He was fifth in the shot put at the 1954 British Empire and Commonwealth Games and second in the hammer at the 1953 Summer International University Sports Week.

Mark Pharaoh was born 18 July 1931 and as a youth attended Manchester Grammar School where he excelled at sport and was an active member of the Gannet patrol of Troop 4 of the school's scouts. He went on to study at Manchester University. Having competed at the 1952 Summer Olympics and having won the British AAA's on four occasions he competed at the 1956 Summer Olympics. He came fourth, setting a British record of 54.27 m. in the process and missing the bronze medal by just 13 cm. Pharaoh also represented Walton Athletic Club in Walton-on-Thames.

National titles

AAA Championships: 1952, 1953, 1955, 1956

References

1931 births
2020 deaths
Sportspeople from Manchester
People from Wandsworth
British male discus throwers
English male discus throwers
Olympic athletes of Great Britain
Athletes (track and field) at the 1952 Summer Olympics
Athletes (track and field) at the 1956 Summer Olympics
Athletes (track and field) at the 1954 British Empire and Commonwealth Games
Alumni of the University of Manchester
Commonwealth Games medallists in athletics
Commonwealth Games bronze medallists for England
Medallists at the 1954 British Empire and Commonwealth Games